The Coalmont Formation (Tmc) is a geologic formation that outcrops in the North Park intermountaine basin in Colorado. It contains fossil plants and coal layers dating back to the Paleogene period.

Fossil content 

The following fossils have been reported from the formation:

Insects 

 Calandrites hindsi
 ?Calandrites ursorum
 ?Carabites arapahoensis
 Curculio beeklyi
 Ophryastites hendersoni

Flora 

 Allantodiopsis erosa
 Ampelopsis acerifolia
 Betula stevensoni
 Carya antiquorum
 Cercidiphyllum arcticum
 Cissus marginata
 Eucommia serrata
 Fraxinus eocenica
 Glyptostrobus nordenskioldi
 Hydromystria expansa
 Lastrea goldiana
 Laurophyllum perseanum
 Laurus socialis
 Lygodium coloradense
 Metasequoia occidentalis
 Mimosites coloradensis
 Nordenskioldia borealis
 Persea brossiana
 Platanus nobilis
 P. raynoldsi
 Prunus corrugis
 Pterocarya hispida
 Quercus greenlandica
 Q. sullyi
 ?Robinia wardi
 Sassafras thermale
 Sparganium antiquum

Wasatchian correlations

See also 

 List of fossiliferous stratigraphic units in Colorado
 Paleontology in Colorado

References

Bibliography 

 
 
 

Geologic formations of Colorado
Eocene Series of North America
Paleocene Series of North America
Paleogene Colorado
Ypresian Stage
Thanetian Stage
Wasatchian
Coal formations
Coal in the United States
Sandstone formations of the United States
Fluvial deposits
Paleontology in Colorado